Kwame Rose (born Darius Kwame Rosebrough) is an American social activist, artist, writer, musician, and public speaker.

Rose gained notoriety during the 2015 Baltimore protests for his confrontation with Fox News reporter Geraldo Rivera, challenging the media's representation of protestors after Freddie Gray's death. Since then, he has become one of the more visible protesters in Baltimore.

Early life 

Kwame was born and raised in Baltimore, MD. 
His passion for public speaking once earned him a full scholarship to the University of Texas at San Antonio as a member of the Debate team. As a student, he advocated for hip-hop-infused education as a means to educate the youth and give a voice to the voiceless. After the completion of his freshman year, deteriorating social conditions in his hometown of Baltimore prompted the permanent return of the young activist with a firm commitment to improve and serve his community.

In 2013, Kwame helped form the organization Brothers In Action, Inc., a mentoring group for young Black males in Baltimore City. He served on the Executive Board until recently stepping down to launch BE Foundation, in an effort to not only highlight Black youth but also, help them excel in pursuing their dreams and aspirations.

In 2020, Kwame joined the labor movement by working with AFSCME Council 67, under the leadership of Glen Middleton.

Freddie Gray protests 

On April 29, 2015, Rose confronted Fox News reporter Geraldo Rivera during the protests for Freddie Gray, asking him to leave Baltimore due to what Rose called one-sided coverage of the protests and the city while ignoring Baltimore's poverty and social issues, how these issues affect citizens' lives, or the community's efforts to unite and clean up the city. On Sept. 2, Rose was arrested during protests at the courthouse. The arrest was videotaped.  Some Black Lives Matter protesters insisted he was targeted for arrest.

Rose was a featured interviewee in the 2017 documentary Baltimore Rising on the protests.

References

Living people
African-American activists
Year of birth missing (living people)
1990s births
Activists from Maryland
People from Baltimore
21st-century African-American people